A detour is a temporary routing to avoid an obstruction.

It may also refer to:

Places

United States
 Grand Detour Township, Ogle County, Illinois
 Grand Detour, Illinois, a village in the township
 Detour, Maryland, an unincorporated village in Carroll County
 Detour Township, Michigan
 De Tour Village, Michigan, a village in the township

Elsewhere
Detour River, a tributary of the Turgeon River, in Quebec, Canada

Literature
 Detour (Goldsmith novel), a 1939 novel by Martin Goldsmith
 Detour (Brodsky novel), a 1977 novel by Michael Brodsky
 The Detour (novel), a 2010 novel by Gerbrand Bakker

Film and television
 Detour (1945 film), an American film noir
 Detour (1967 film), a Bulgarian drama
 Detour (2009 Canadian film), a Canadian thriller directed by Sylvain Guy
 Detour (2009 Norwegian film), a Norwegian horror directed by Severin Eskeland
 Detour (2013 film), a film directed by William Dickerson
 Detour (2016 film), a thriller directed by Christopher Smith
 Detour (2021 film), a Nigerian crime drama
 Détour, a 2017 short film directed by Michel Gondry
 Detours (film), a 2016 road-trip comedy 
 Teletoon Detour, an adult-oriented cartoon block on the Canadian television channel Teletoon
 "Detour" (The X-Files), a fifth-season episode of The X-Files
 "Detour" (Frasier episode), an eleventh-season episode of Frasier
 "Detour" (NCIS), a tenth-season episode of NCIS
 Detour (Transformers), a member of the Micromasters
 The Detour (TV series), an American comedy television series

Music
 LA Weekly Detour Music Festival, often referred to as just Detour, a music festival held annually in downtown Los Angeles, California
 Detour (Christine Allen album), 1980
 Detour (Cyndi Lauper album), 2016
 Detours (Saga album), 1997
 Detours (Sheryl Crow album), 2008
"Detours" (song), a 2008 single from Sheryl Crow's album of the same name
 "Detour" (song), a 1951 song recorded by Patti Page
The Detours, a previous name of the Who
 "Detour", a 2019 song from their album Who

Other
 Frolic and detour, a legal term for an employee acting without order from his employer and temporarily leaving the employer's premises
 Microsoft Detours, an open source library for intercepting, monitoring and instrumenting binary functions on Microsoft Windows